Hayatou is a surname. Notable people with the surname include:

Issa Hayatou (born 1946), Cameroonian athlete and sports executive
Sadou Hayatou (1942–2019), Cameroonian politician and Prime Minister of Cameroon

Surnames of African origin